Jos Cillien (19 July 1911 – 26 April 1984) was a Luxembourgian gymnast. He competed in eight events at the 1936 Summer Olympics.

References

1911 births
1984 deaths
Luxembourgian male artistic gymnasts
Olympic gymnasts of Luxembourg
Gymnasts at the 1936 Summer Olympics
Sportspeople from Esch-sur-Alzette
20th-century Luxembourgian people